Grynocharis quadrilineata is a species of bark-gnawing beetle in the family Lophocateridae.

References

Further reading

External links

 

Beetles described in 1844